Abou Sakal Football Club, is an Egyptian football club based in Sinai, Egypt. The club currently plays in the Egyptian Second Division, the second-highest league in the Egyptian football league system.

References

Egyptian Second Division
Football clubs in Egypt